While We're Young is an album by jazz guitarist John Abercrombie with organist Dan Wall and drummer Adam Nussbaum that was released by ECM in 1993.

Reception
The Allmusic review by Michael G. Nastos awarded the album 4 stars, stating, "This trio hits on many different angles, from somber and reverent to acutely kinetic and truly electrifying. This is exploratory music, unique unto itself, and a landmark fusion of the '90s. If this kind of jazz is what you crave, those who were young in the '70s, it's a must-buy, no doubt."  The Penguin Guide to Jazz awarded the album 3½ stars, stating, "It was widely assumed in 1992 that Abercrombie's organ trio—poised somewhere between Wes Montgomery and Lifetime—was a one-off idea, a forgivable self-indulgence that actually worked better than one had a right to expect. In fact its great success has largely defined Abercrombie's recent career and has very significantly kick-started his playing."

Track listing

Personnel
 John Abercrombie – guitar
 Dan Wall – Hammond organ
 Adam Nussbaum – drums

References

ECM Records albums
John Abercrombie (guitarist) albums
1992 albums
Albums produced by Manfred Eicher